is a passenger railway station in the city of Ichihara, Chiba Prefecture, Japan, operated by the East Japan Railway Company (JR East).

Lines
Yawatajuku Station is served by the Uchibo Line, and lies 5.6 kilometers from the terminus of the line at Soga Station.

Station layout
The station consists of an elevated station building, and has two sets of tracks running around an island platform. The station is staffed.

Platforms

History
Yawatajuku Station was opened on March 28, 1912 as a station on the Japanese Government Railways (JGR) Kisarazu Line. On May 24, 1919, the line's name changed to the Hōjō Line, and on April 15, 1929 to the Bōsō Line and on April 1, 1933 to the Bōsōnishi Line. It became part of the Japan National Railways (JNR) after World War II, and the line was renamed the Uchibō Line from July 15, 1972. The station assumed its present name from March 31, 1974. Yawatajuku Station was absorbed into the JR East network upon the privatization of the Japan National Railways (JNR) on April 1, 1987.

Passenger statistics
In fiscal 2019, the station was used by an average of 11,905 passengers daily (boarding passengers only).

Surroundings
Ichihara Police Station
Teikyo Heisei University
Yawata Junior High School
Yawata Elementary School
 
 
Ichihara Sporeku Park
Port Pier Ichihara

See also
 List of railway stations in Japan

References

External links

 JR East Station information  

Railway stations in Japan opened in 1912
Railway stations in Chiba Prefecture
Uchibō Line
Ichihara, Chiba